Carlos Rúben Navarro Valdez (born 8 May 1996) is a Mexican taekwondo athlete.

He represented his country at the 2016 Summer Olympics in Rio de Janeiro, in the men's 58 kg.

In 2019, he competed in the men's bantamweight event at the 2019 World Taekwondo Championships in Manchester, United Kingdom.

References

External links
 

1996 births
Living people
Mexican male taekwondo practitioners
Olympic taekwondo practitioners of Mexico
Taekwondo practitioners at the 2016 Summer Olympics
Pan American Games medalists in taekwondo
Pan American Games gold medalists for Mexico
Taekwondo practitioners at the 2015 Pan American Games
World Taekwondo Championships medalists
Medalists at the 2015 Pan American Games
Sportspeople from Ciudad Juárez
21st-century Mexican people